

Plants

Angiosperms

Arthropods

Insects

Mollusca

Newly named bivalves

Archosauromorphs
 Sankar Chatterjee's discovery of a possible Triassic bird, Protoavis, if genuine, would push avian origins back almost 70 million years. The find ignites controversy over the connection between dinosaurs and birds.

Newly named dinosaurs
Data courtesy of George Olshevsky's dinosaur genera list.

Newly named birds

Genera no longer considered to be birds
 Protoavis. The avian status of Protoavis has since been almost universally rejected by paleontologists.

Pterosaurs

New taxa

Synapsids

Non-mammalian

References

 
1990s in paleontology
Paleontology